Lansana Kamara (born 10 June 1992) is a Sierra Leonean international footballer who plays as a midfielder.

Career
Born in Freetown, Kamara has played for F.C. Kallon, Eskilstuna City, Vimmerby and Umeå.

He made his international debut for Sierra Leone in 2014.

References

1992 births
Living people
Sierra Leonean footballers
Sierra Leone international footballers
F.C. Kallon players
Eskilstuna City FK players
Vimmerby IF players
Umeå FC players
Ettan Fotboll players
Division 2 (Swedish football) players
Association football midfielders
Sierra Leonean expatriate footballers
Sierra Leonean expatriate sportspeople in Sweden
Expatriate footballers in Sweden